The 2018 UCI Oceania Tour was the 14th season of the UCI Oceania Tour. The season began on 17 January 2018 with the New Zealand Cycle Classic and finished on 25 March 2018 with the Continental Championships.

Throughout the season, points are awarded to the top finishers of stages within stage races and the final general classification standings of each of the stages races and one-day events. The quality and complexity of a race also determines how many points are awarded to the top finishers, the higher the UCI rating of a race, the more points are awarded.
The UCI ratings from highest to lowest are as follows:
 Multi-day events: 2.HC, 2.1 and 2.2
 One-day events: 1.HC, 1.1 and 1.2

Events

References

External links
 

 
UCI Oceania Tour
UCI Oceania Tour
UCI Oceania Tour